Mordecai Lincoln House may refer to:

Mordecai Lincoln House (Springfield, Kentucky), listed on the NRHP in Kentucky
Mordecai Lincoln House (Lorane, Pennsylvania), listed on the NRHP in Pennsylvania